The heart scarab is an oval, scarab artifact dating from ancient Egypt. Mostly an amulet, it was also used as jewelry, a memorializing artifact, or a grave good. The heart scarab was used by referring to Chapter 30 from the Book of the Dead and the weighing of the heart, being balanced by Maat, goddess of truth, justice, order, wisdom, and cosmic balance. The function of the heart scarab was to bind the heart to silence while it was being weighed in the underworld to ensure that the heart did not bear false witness against the deceased. As in many current religions, the individual had to show 'worthiness' to achieve the afterlife. The heart was extremely important to ancient Egyptians as the seat of intelligence and the storehouse of memory. It was the only organ left in place during mummification. Heart scarab amulets were meant as substitutes for the heart should the deceased be deprived of the organ in the afterlife. For example, when a person died, a heart scarab was often placed on their heart and bound underneath the bandages of the mummy. This was to ensure that it could not be physically removed from their person. The significance of the heart scarab to the ancient Egyptians also stems from the religious importance of the scarab beetle, Scarabaeus sacer. The scarab beetle represented rebirth and creation.  As the beetle larvae grow, they eat their way out of the balls of dung where they were laid and emerge. The Egyptians saw this as the beetles emerging from nothingness into new life, which aligns with their beliefs in an afterlife and rebirth.P8H:Aa11  

The amulets are described in the Book of the Dead to be made (per Andrews, Amulets of Ancient Egypt) of a stone: nmhf, nemehef (not now identified); typically green stones, green jasper, serpentine, and basalt. Andrews continues to say they are in fact made from: green or dark-green materials, such as glazed steatite, schist, feldspar, hematite and obsidian; also blue-glazed composition (faience), Egyptian blue, rock crystal, alabaster or red jasper. Instead of the head of a scarab, heart scarabs had the head of a human and were often inscribed with chapter 30B of the Book of Going Forth by Day. Heart scarabs were also used in the design of pectorals, which were a rectangular chest ornament. 

The alternate heart amulet itself represents similar ideas, but is made in the form of the heart as used by the Egyptian language hieroglyph. F34

Heart scarabs throughout Egyptian history 
Until the beginning of the 18th Dynasty, the heart scarab had a strong connection to Theban royalty. During the 21st Dynasty, it stood as an important item of magical protection among the priesthood of Amun. After the 21st Dynasty, the amulet is rarely depicted in human contexts and is instead associated with specific divinities.

Heart scarabs went through significant modifications in their design over the course of history. For example, during the New Kingdom, heart scarabs were large, typically between four and five centimeters long.  Then, in the Third Intermediate Period, a new variation of the heart scarab emerged. This new scarab was much smaller, at about two to four centimeters long. Due to their smaller size, these heart scarabs were not engraved. Unlike other heart scarabs that were placed directly above a person's heart and wrapped into their bandages, these new variations of heart scarabs were actually placed inside the person's chest cavity, alongside their true heart.

Ancient Egyptian amulets
Besides the personal use of the amulet in life, the body was often provided with amulets in burial, with more amulets implying more protection. The most common funerary amulets were the heart scarab, Wadjet Eye, Djed Pillar amulet, Wadj amulet, Tyet amulet, and the Golden-vulture collar, (for goddess Mut). Amulet usage changed greatly over the millenniums of ancient Egypt.

The papyrus stem, M13 or Wadj amulet was made from 'green feldspar' as prescribed in Chapter 160, Chapter 159 from the Book of the Dead. The most common explanation for the amulet is that it provided 'eternal youth' to the deceased.

Gallery

Heart scarab, multiple types

Heart amulet

See also
Egyptian hieroglyphs
Scarab (artifact)
Papyrus stem amulet
Stair-single (hieroglyph)
List of ancient Egyptian statuary with amulet necklaces

References

 Andrews, 1994. Amulets of Ancient Egypt, chapter 4: Scarabs for the living and funerary scarabs, pp 50–59, Andrews, Carol, c 1993, University of Texas Press, 518 amulets, 1, or multiples included in 12 necklaces; (softcover)
Budge, 1978, (1920).  An Egyptian Hieroglyphic Dictionary, E.A.Wallace Budge, (Dover Publications), c 1978, (c 1920), Dover edition, c 1978; cliv-(154) and 1314 pp. (In two volumes) (softcover)

External links
Heart scarab, Israel Museum
Amulets of Egypt & history of Mummification, Egypt; amulets: Djed Pillar, Staircase amulet, Headrest amulet, Heart amulet, Foot amulet & Hand amulet
Heart amulet, amulet and explanation

Ancient Egyptian culture
Egyptian amulets
Scarabs (artifacts)